The 2010 Dutch National Omnium Championships were the Dutch national track cycling Championships for the omnium discipline. The competitions took place at Sportpaleis Alkmaar in Alkmaar, the Netherlands on February 7, 2010.

Competition format

The competition consisted both for men and women of five events, with a point-for-place system.
 Points race: a points race, with scoring for intermediate sprints as well as for lapping the pack.
 Scratch race: a  scratch race, with all riders competing at once and first across the line winning.

Women's Results

Final Results 

Results

Men's results 
Results

References

2010 Dutch National Track Championships
Men's omnium
Women's omnium